Vermes ("worms") is an obsolete taxon used by Carl Linnaeus and  Jean-Baptiste Lamarck  for non-arthropod invertebrate animals.

Linnaeus

In Linnaeus's Systema Naturae, the Vermes had the rank of class, occupying the 6th (and last) slot of his animal systematics. It was divided into the following orders, all except the Lithophyta containing (in modern terms) organisms from a variety of phyla:

 Intestina, including horsehair worms, earthworms, roundworms, liver flukes, leeches, hagfishes, and shipworms
 Mollusca, including slugs, sea slugs, polychaetes, sea mice, priapulids, salps, jellyfish, starfish, and sea urchins
 Testacea, including chitons, barnacles, clams, cockles, nautiluses, snails and serpulid worms
 Lithophyta, including various corals
 Zoophyta, including bryozoans, coralline algae, Hydra, sea pens, tapeworms, and Volvox

Apart from the Mollusca, understood very differently from the modern phylum of that name, Linnaeus included a very diverse and rather mismatched assemblage of animals in the categories. The Intestina group encompassed various parasitic animals, among them the hagfish, which Linnaeus would have found in dead fish.  Shelled molluscs were placed in the Testacea, together with barnacles and tube worms. Cnidarians (jellyfish and corals), Echinoderms and polychaetes were spread across the other orders.

Lamarck

Linnaeus's system was revised by Jean-Baptiste Lamarck in his 1801 Système des Animaux sans Vertebres. In this work, he categorized echinoderms, arachnids, crustaceans and annelids, which he separated from Vermes.

Modern

After Linnaeus, and especially with the advent of Darwinism, it became apparent that the Vermes animals are not closely related. Systematic works on phyla since Linnaeus continued to split up Vermes and sort the animals into natural systematic units.

Of the classes of Vermes proposed by Linnaeus, only Mollusca has been kept as a phylum, and its composition has changed almost entirely. Linnaeus's early classification of the soft-bodied organisms was revolutionary in its day. A number of the organisms classified as Vermes by Linnaeus were very poorly known, and a number of them were not even viewed as animals.

References 

Worms (obsolete taxon)
Obsolete animal taxa
animal classes